Madrasi is 2006 Tamil-language action film produced by Subha Sandeep on Inspired Movies & Spice Team Entertainments banner and directed by Arjun. The film stars Arjun, Jagapati Babu, Vedhika, and Gajala  with music composed by D. Imman. It is the debut movie of Vedhika. It was considered as an average grosser at the box office. The film was partially reshot into Telugu as Sivakasi with Sunil and M. S. Narayana replacing Vivek and Vennira Aadai Moorthy, respectively.

Plot

Kaasi (Arjun) comes to Mumbai to track his parents' killers. He is successful in finding the first two and kills them and the third person escapes from him. Ravi Bhai and Mani Bhai are the two leading goons in Dharavi, Mumbai. Both were brothers then but now are enemies. Both keep trying to kill each other. To find the third one, Kasu joins Ravi Bhai (Raj Kapoor). Ravi is at loggerheads with his brother Mani Bhai (FEFSI Vijayan). Mani runs another gang, and the leading goonda in this gang is Siva (Jagapati Babu). Siva rescues mani Bhai from goons while he is casting a vote in a booth. Siva has a younger brother named Raghu. Raghu takes his brother to see a girl get her brother married. After a small complication with the girl, Siva gets married to her. Meanwhile,  Kasi falls in love with Anjali after he fights for her father being harassed by goons. One day they both go to a restaurant. They both don't have anything but the bearer gives the bill to Kasi. Meanwhile, Siva is also there in the restaurant sitting behind Kasi's table with his wife. Siva meets Kasi there as Kaasi and Siva know each other from a meeting in jail, but now they both work for rivals.

Hence they are now enemies. A builder comes to Ravi Bhai and says that his brother is threatening him to give his share which he doesn't agree and asks to give protection to him till he goes to the airport to board the Singapore flight. Kasi gets a chance to prove himself to Ravi Bhai. He arranges for protection but it ends in vain and the builder is killed by Mani Bhai with the help of Siva as he tracks him and knows over the telephone that the flight is on one hour delay. Kasi gets upset but Ravi Bhai calms him down. After a small fight in the restaurant, Kasi and Siva's mobiles get exchanged, and run away. Siva gets a call from Ravi Bhai on Kaasi's mobile and knows that he received weapons from a party and it needs to be at a safe place. Siva plans an idea to avenge Ravi Bhai and arranges for a man who runs from the police after hitting one of the policemen. Police chase the person and he runs into the godown where the weapons are stored which belongs to Ravi Bhai. Police seize those weapons and call Ravi Bhai for inquiry. But Kasi tells that the godown does not belong to Ravi Bhai but to some other guy. And they leave the place. Siva's wife calls him and tells him that his brother has gone missing. Siva goes in search of him and finds him where he works. He beats the goons and also Mani Bhai's son who was responsible for this. After an argument with Mani Bhai, Siva leaves his gang. Siva meets Kasi and tells him to give protection to his brother despite being an enemy to which Kasi also agrees. Knowing this Ravi Bhai asks Kasi to hand over Siva's brother but Kasi refuses. Kaasi gets into an argument with Ravi and leaves Ravi Bhai's gang.

Siva leaves his brother in Kaasi's custody. Mani and Ravi, now unite and wanting to separate Siva and Kaasi, plan to kill Siva's brother by killing Kaasi's lover Anjali (Vedhika), and diverting Kaasi. Siva's brother is killed, and Siva gets mad at Kaasi. After that, Siva and Kaasi become mutually understood to kill all the gangsters, including Ravi's son. However, Kaasi demands not to kill Ravi's son and agrees to help him kill all the villains. In the end on a train engine, every gangster was killed, and Kaasi was fired by Mani. Siva tries to kill Ravi's son, but Kaasi shows a pistol to Siva, By seeing that Kaasi is injured by a bullet, Siva changes his mind, and Kaasi dies.

Cast
 Arjun as Kaasi
 Vedhika as Anjali
 Jagapathi Babu as Siva
 Gajala as Meenakshi
 Vivek as Pandi 
 Vennira Aadai Moorthy 
 Rajkapoor as Ravi Bhai
 FEFSI Vijayan as Mani Bhai
 Rahul Ravindran as Ravi Bhai's brother
 Periya Karuppu Thevar as Naidu
 Manish Borundia

Production
Newcomer Vedhika was selected to make her debut as a lead actress after she was approached by Arjun's manager. The film also marked the debut of Telugu actor Jagapathi Babu in Tamil cinema.

Soundtrack
The soundtrack contains remixed version of "Adho Andha Paravai" from Aayirathil Oruvan (1965).

Release
The satellite rights of the film were sold to Raj TV. The film was given an "A" certificate by the Indian Censor Board.

Reception
The Hindu wrote "You do understand Arjun's sincerity in trying out a different storyline within the restricted ambit of action, sentiment, romance and comedy. Yet after a point you can't help feeling that you've seen most of it many times before. However Arjun's target audience may help the 'Madrasi' cruise comfortably."

References

2006 films
2000s Tamil-language films
Indian action films
Films directed by Arjun Sarja
2006 action films